Statistics for the 2003 season of the Lao League.

Overview
MCTPC FC (Ministry of Communication, Transportation, Post and Construction), described in the source as Telecom and Transportation, won the championship.

References

Lao Premier League seasons
1
Laos
Laos